Martial Law is a 1991 American action/martial arts film written by Richard Brandes, produced by Kurt Anderson, directed by Steve Cohen and stars Chad McQueen, Cynthia Rothrock and David Carradine.

Plot
Two cops - Sean Thompson (Chad McQueen) and his partner Billie Blake (Cynthia Rothrock) are on the front line in the city's never ending war on crime. In addition to the routine small-time robberies they're dealing with on a daily basis, they must face a very dangerous and powerful man called Dalton Rhodes (David Carradine), who's not only a smuggler of guns and stolen luxury cars, but also a master of martial arts. Police are finding one body after another of mafia related people (all killed with bare hands). Sean and Billie have only vague clues in this case and no idea who's actually behind those murders. An aid in solving the riddle is to come from Sean's troubled younger brother Michael, who's found himself working for the mob boss Rhodes. Soon he'll learn that an easy way to get rich is also extremely dangerous and sometimes lethal.

Cast
 Chad McQueen as Officer Sean Thompson
 Cynthia Rothrock as Officer Billie Blake
 David Carradine as Dalton Rhoades
 Andy McCutcheon as Michael Thompson
 Philip Tan as Wu Han
 Tony Longo as Booker
 John Fujioka as Chang
 Vincent Craig Dupree as 'Faster' Brown
 Jim Malinda as Captain Sykes
 Rick Walters as Colonel Cramer
 Patricia Wilson as Grace
 Lars Lundgren as Ruppin
 Professor Toru Tanaka as Jimmy Kong

Release

The film was released directly to VHS in 1991 by Media Home Entertainment and CBS/FOX. The film has been released on DVD in Europe, by Bellevue entertainment. It is part of movie package (contains four movies on two DVDs), along with Savate, Martial Law II: Undercover, and Mission of Justice. 

On November 27, 2020, the cult label Vinegar Syndrome revealed a Blu-ray double feature of Martial Law and Martial Law II as part of their VSA line of limited editions, with both films remastered in 4K from their original camera negatives, marking their first release in the US since VHS.

External links

 
 Martial Law at Letterboxd

1991 films
1991 action films
American action films
1991 martial arts films
American martial arts films
1990s English-language films
Films directed by Steve Cohen
1990s American films